Howard Chang may refer to:

Howard F. Chang (born 1960), American legal academic
Howard Y. Chang (born 1972), Taiwanese-born American physician-scientist